The  was a Japanese samurai clan that claimed descent from the Minamoto clan. Its first power base was in Hitachi Province. The clan was subdued by Minamoto no Yoritomo in the late 12th century, but later entered Yoritomo's service as vassals. In the Muromachi period, the Satake served as Governor (shugo) of Hitachi Province (today Ibaraki Prefecture), under the aegis of the Ashikaga shogunate. The clan sided with the Western Army during the Battle of Sekigahara, and was punished by Tokugawa Ieyasu, who moved it to a smaller territory in northern Dewa Province (northern Honshū) at the start of the Edo period. The Satake survived as lords (daimyō) of the Kubota Domain (also known as the Akita Domain). Over the course of the Edo period, two major branches of the Satake clan were established, one ruled the fief of Iwasaki, the other one the fief of Kubota-Shinden.

During the Boshin War of 1868–69, the Satake were signatories to the pact that formed the Ōuetsu Reppan Dōmei, but after internal debate and a disagreement with the Sendai Domain, the clan switched sides and joined the imperial forces in subduing the alliance. As with all other daimyō families, the Satake clan was relieved of its title in 1871.

Origins

The Satake clan claimed descent from Satake Masayoshi, the grandson of the prominent 11th century warrior Minamoto no Yoshimitsu. Yoshimitsu received land in Mutsu Province and Hitachi Province as a reward for his military service, and took up residence at Satake village, in Hitachi. Yoshimitsu willed the territory around Satake village to his son, Yoshinobu. Yoshinobu, in turn, passed it on to his own son, Masayoshi. The Satake clan would remain in Hitachi until they were ordered to move in 1602. In 1106, Masayoshi led a rebellion against Minamoto no Yoshikuni, a power figure in neighboring Shimotsuke Province, but was defeated and killed by Yoshikuni, who followed him back to Hitachi. During the Genpei War, Masayoshi's son Takayoshi sided with Taira no Kiyomori. The Satake clan was defeated by Minamoto no Yoritomo in 1180, and its territory confiscated; it was not until nine years later that Yoritomo forgave Takayoshi's son Hideyoshi, and allowed Hideyoshi to become his vassal. Hideyoshi served in the attack on Mutsu Province. The Satake clan later returned to its old territory in Hitachi.

Muromachi and Sengoku periods

In the Muromachi period (1336–1573), the Satake family's heads served as hereditary governors (shugo) of Hitachi Province. They were vassals of the Ashikaga shogunate's Kamakura-kubō, the Kamakura-based official who oversaw the Ashikaga shogunate's affairs in the Kantō region. The Satake clan saw a great deal of military service under the Ashikaga banner.

In the Sengoku period, the Satake worked toward unifying the often rebellious clans of the Hitachi region under their control. He often fought against the Later Hōjō clan, who were extending their power into southern Hitachi. One such encounter was the Battle of Numajiri, where 20,000 men under Yoshishige fought 80,000 Hōjō troops. The Satake won, due in part to the use of over 8600 matchlock rifles by their troops.

In 1586 and again in 1589, the Satake also fought with the Date clan at Sukagawa, but were ultimately defeated by forces under the command of Date Masamune.

In 1590, under the headship of Yoshishige's son Satake Yoshinobu, the Satake clan pledged fealty to Toyotomi Hideyoshi during the siege of Odawara. After the fall of Odawara, Hideyoshi accepted them as vassals, and guaranteed their lordship of a 540,000 koku swath of territory in Hitachi Province. Having received recognition from Hideyoshi as the ruler of Hitachi Province, Yoshinobu's drive for unifying the province under his rule was strengthened. He brought nearly all of the province under his control, with the exception of the Tsuchiura and Shimodate areas, the control of which Hideyoshi had assured to the Yūki clan.

In 1593, the Satake clan joined in Hideyoshi's invasion of Korea, deploying troops to Nagoya Castle in Hizen Province.

Edo era

In 1600, the Satake sided with the Western Army at the Battle of Sekigahara, and were discovered to be in secret communication with Ishida Mitsunari, the leader of the Western Army. After the Western Army's defeat by the Eastern forces of Tokugawa Ieyasu, the Satake clan was allowed to remain where they were in Hitachi but they would be punished by the victorious Tokugawa. The clan's income was severely reduced and in 1602 the clan was ordered to relocate to Kubota, a much smaller fief in northern Japan, where they remained until 1871.

Kubota's income level was 205,000 koku, and it was classified as an outside (tozama) daimyō. The income level remained constant throughout its history. The domain often had agricultural crises, which resulted in several peasant uprisings throughout the course of its history.

Satake Yoshiatsu (better known by his nom-de-plume Satake Shozan), the 8th generation lord of Kubota, was an accomplished artist. Yoshiatsu painted a number of paintings in the Dutch style, and also produced three treatises on European painting techniques, including the depiction of perspective. He was also a student of Dutch studies (rangaku) scholar Hiraga Gennai, who he had invited up to Akita to advise him on management of the domain's copper mines.

The Kubota domain was uncommon in that it contained more than one castle, despite the Tokugawa shogunate's "one castle per domain" rule. The main castle was Kubota Castle, but there were also castles at Yokote and Ōdate, and five fortified estates elsewhere in the domain: Kakudate, Yuzawa, Hiyama, Jūniso, and In'nai. Each of these was given to a senior retainer who ran it as his own small castle town. The senior retainers had personal retainers who resided in these castle towns.

Two of the clan elder (karō) families serving the Kubota domain were branches of the Satake family. One was the North Satake family (Satake-hokke), stipended at 10,000 koku; the other the West Satake family (Satake-nishike), stipended at 7200 koku. The North Satake family had its landholdings around Kakunodate, one of the fortified estates mentioned above; the West Satake resided in and had their landholdings around Ōdate. Another karō family unrelated to the Satake was the Tomura, who held Yokote castle.

During its rule over Kubota, the Satake clan was ranked as a  family, and as such, had the privilege of shogunal audiences in the Great Hall (Ohiroma) of Edo Castle. Though no Satake lord ever held the office of shōgun, the clan (together with many of the other domains of northern Honshū) assisted the shogunate in policing the frontier region of Ezochi (now Hokkaido).

Boshin war

After the restoration of imperial rule in late 1867, the Boshin War broke out in early 1868, pitting the coalition of southern domains against the forces of the former Tokugawa shogunate. After the city of Edo fell, remnants of the Tokugawa forces retreated northward, and the fighting followed northward. The Satake clan was a signatory to the pact that formed the Ōuetsu Reppan Dōmei, the alliance of anti-Satchō northern domains led by the Sendai Domain. The Satake clan's delegation at Shiroishi, the alliance's headquarters, was led by the clan elder (karō) Tomura Yoshiari. However, the Satake had political difficulties with the alliance, which culminated in the murder, in Akita, of a delegation from Sendai on August 21, 1868, and the display of the messengers' gibbeted heads in the Akita castle town. The Sendai delegation, led by Shimo Matazaemon, was dispatched to request the Akita domain to hand over Kujō Michitaka and other officials of the imperial delegation that had been originally sent to the region to gather support for the imperial cause. The Satake then backed out of the alliance and supported the imperial army; eleven days later, on September 1, 1868 the Tsugaru clan of the neighboring Hirosaki domain followed suit. In response, the pro-alliance domains of Morioka and Ichinoseki sent troops to attack Kubota. Kubota forces were hard-pressed to defend their territory, with the result that the alliance troops had made serious advances before the war's end; Yokote Castle was burned, and by October 7, Morioka troops took Ōdate, the last of the Akita domain's castles. In early 1869, Satake Yoshitaka formally gave up the domain's registers to the imperial government, and was made imperial governor of the Akita domain (han chiji). In mid-1869, the imperial government rewarded the service rendered by the main line of the Satake clan, by raising its income by 20,000 koku. The heads of all the Satake clan's branches were relieved of office as daimyō in 1871, and ordered to relocate to Tokyo.

Meiji and beyond

In the Meiji era, Satake Yoshitaka was ennobled with the title of marquess (kōshaku). Satake Yoshisato of Iwasaki received the title of viscount (shishaku). The North Satake family received the title of baron (danshaku).

Yoshitaka's son Yoshinao served in the Imperial Japanese Army, and fought in the Satsuma Rebellion.

Norihisa Satake, the current governor of Akita Prefecture, is a descendant of the North Satake branch of the clan.

Family Heads

Kubota

As lord of the Kubota Domain
 Satake Yoshinobu (1570–1633)
 Satake Yoshitaka (1609–1672)
 Satake Yoshizumi (1637–1703)
 Satake Yoshitada (1695–1715)
 Satake Yoshimine (1690–1745)
 Satake Yoshimasa (1728–1753)

 Satake Yoshiharu (1723–1758)
 Satake Yoshiatsu (1748–1785)
 Satake Yoshimasa (1775–1815)
 Satake Yoshihiro (1812–1846)
 Satake Yoshichika (1839–1857)
 Satake Yoshitaka (1825–1884, last lord of Kubota)
 Satake Yoshinao (1854–1893)

Iwasaki

 Satake Yoshinaga (1655–1741)
 Satake Yoshimichi (1701–1765)
 Satake Yoshitada (1730–1787)
 Satake Yoshimoto (1759–1793)
 Satake Yoshichika (1787–1821)

 Satake Yoshizumi (1802–1856)
 Satake Yoshizane (1825–1884; became Satake Yoshitaka, last lord of Akita)
 Satake Yoshitsuma (1837–1870)
 Satake Yoshisato (1858–1914)

Kubota-Shinden
 Satake Yoshikuni (1665–1725)
 Satake Yoshikata (1692–1742)

Notable Retainers
 Makabe Ujimoto (1550–1622)
 Onuki Yorihisa (1544–1603)
 Oba Yoshinari
 Oba Tadanobu
 Tomura Yoshikuni (Jūdayū)
 Wada Akitame (1532–1618)

Notes

References
 "Akita ranga" on Japanese Architecture and Art Net Users System. Accessed 19 August 2008.
 "Ashikaga-shi (Kamakura kubō)" on Harimaya.com (accessed 19 August 2008)
 
 French, Calvin L., et al. (1978). Through Closed Doors: Western Influence on Japanese Art 1639–1853. Rochester, Michigan: Oakland University.
 Hoshi, Ryōichi (1997). Ōuetsu Reppandōmei. Tokyo: Chūōkōron-shinsha.
 Karino, Tokuzō (1910). Satake-ke rekidai jiryaku 佐竹家歴代事略. Akita: Karino Sadakichi. (Accessed from National Diet Library, 17 August 2008)
  "Kubota-han" on Edo 300 HTML (accessed 15 August 2008)
 List of Meiji-era Japanese nobility (accessed 17 August 2008)
 McClellan, Edwin (1985). Woman in the Crested Kimono. New Haven: Yale University Press.
 Naramoto, Tatsuya (1992). Nihon no kassen: monoshiri jiten. Tokyo: Shufu-to-seikatsusha.
 Noguchi, Shin'ichi (2005). Aizu-han. Tokyo: Gendai shokan.
 Onodera, Eikō (2005). Boshin nanboku sensō to Tōhoku seiken. Sendai: Kita no mori.
 Saga, Jun'ichi (1987). Memories of Silk and Straw: A Self-Portrait of Small-Town Japan. New York: Kodansha International.
 Sasaki, Suguru (2002). Boshin sensō: haisha no Meiji-ishin. Tokyo: Chuōkōron-shinsha.
  "Satake-shi" on Harimaya.com (accessed 15 August 2008)
 Yamakawa Kenjirō (1933). Aizu Boshin senshi. Tokyo: Tokyo Daigaku shuppankai.
 Zusetsu: Nihon meijō-shū (2003). Tokyo: Gakken.

See also
 Boshin War
 Tsugaru clan
 Hitachi Province

 
Ōuetsu Reppan Dōmei
Japanese clans
Meiji Restoration